Mah Salari (also Romanized as Māh Sālārī; also known as Māsālārī) is a village in Kuhestan Rural District, Rostaq District, Darab County, Fars Province, Iran. At the 2006 census, its population was 90, in 24 families.

References 

Populated places in Darab County